Sanda Wizaya  (Arakanese:စန္ဒာဝီဇရ; commonly known as Thaungnyo  was a 35th king of the Mrauk-U Dynasty of Arakan from 1710 to 1731. The Kingdom was left without central administration after his death.

Early life 

The future king born in old city of Hkrit called Hkrit Creek or 'Khrit Chaung' (ခြိတ်ချောင်း) modern day Minbya Township. His name was Thaungyo (တုံးညို) who was likely born around the 1670s.

Biography 

Ever since the death of King Sanda Thudhamma, the kingdom had been a disturbed state and internal chaos crippled the nation. 
beginning of the 18th century, near the mouth of Lemro River, and other places were seized by robber chiefs Whose gangs devastated the country. Thaungnyo, a man of low origin but strong will, having more by good lack than anything else, defeated one of the gangs and gained over the inhabitants of the capital.

Later, declared himself king and justified his authority by clearing the country of daciots who infested it and forcibly exiled the Kamein; who wore the king's palace guards after the Arakanese lost the control of Chittagong in 1666. He repaired the Mahâmuni, Mahâti and walls of the city, built himself a new palace.

Also launched a military campaign against the Mughals to retake Chittagong which resulted nominal control, after taking advantages of the disturbances of Mughal Emperor Jahandar Shah, which ravaged the lower part of Bengal with his armies.

He died in 1731 after his assassination and was succeeded by his son in-law, Sanda Thuriya III.

References

Bibliography
 
 
 
 

Wizaya
18th century in Burma
18th-century Burmese monarchs